Fryggesboda is a small locality with a handful of households situated in Lindesberg Municipality, Örebro County, Sweden.

Populated places in Örebro County
Populated places in Lindesberg Municipality